Quesada pasiega is a dessert typical of the region of Cantabria, Spain. It is one of the best-known dishes of Cantabrian cuisine.  It has the consistency of a dense pudding, and is made from milk, sugar, butter, wheat flour, and egg, and flavored with lemon zest and cinnamon.  It can be served hot or cold.

See also 
 Sobao pasiego

References

Spanish desserts
Cantabrian cuisine
Spanish cuisine
Custard desserts